The 1991–92 QMJHL season was the 23rd season in the history of the Quebec Major Junior Hockey League. The league inaugurates the Molson Cup, awarded to the overall "Rookie of the Year," in addition to the existing Michel Bergeron Trophy and Raymond Lagacé Trophy.

The top three scorers in the league, are all linemates from the Saint-Hyacinthe Laser. Centreman Charles Poulin won the QMJHL's Most Valuable Player and CHL Player of the Year. Completing the line were; left winger Patrick Poulin, the league's scoring champion; and right winger Martin Gendron, the league's Most sportsmanlike player and Offensive Player of the Year.
The league went back to the players wearing a half visor.

Twelve teams played 70 games each in the schedule. Verdun Collège Français finished first overall in the regular season, winning their first Jean Rougeau Trophy, and won its first President's Cup, defeating the Trois-Rivières Draveurs in the finals.

Team changes
 Longueuil Collège Français relocated to Verdun, Quebec, becoming Verdun Collège Français.

Final standings
Note: GP = Games played; W = Wins; L = Losses; T = Ties; PTS = Points; GF = Goals for; GA = Goals against

complete list of standings.

Scoring leaders
Note: GP = Games played; G = Goals; A = Assists; Pts = Points; PIM = Penalties in minutes

 complete scoring statistics

Playoffs
Robert Guillet was the leading scorer of the playoffs with 25 points (14 goals, 11 assists).

Division semifinals
 Verdun Collège Français defeated Saint-Hyacinthe Laser 4 games to 2.
 Laval Titan defeated Hull Olympiques 4 games to 2.
 Trois-Rivières Draveurs defeated Drummondville Voltigeurs 4 games to 0.
 Shawinigan Cataractes defeated Chicoutimi Saguenéens 4 games to 0.

Division finals
 Verdun Collège Français defeated Shawinigan Cataractes 4 games to 2.
 Trois-Rivières Draveurs defeated Laval Titan 4 games to 0.

Finals
 Verdun Collège Français defeated Trois-Rivières Draveurs 4 games to 3.

All-star teams
First team
 Goaltender - Jean-Francois Labbe, Trois-Rivières Draveurs
 Left defence - Francois Groleau, Shawinigan Cataractes
 Right defence - Yan Arsenault, Verdun Collège Français
 Left winger - Patrick Poulin, Saint-Hyacinthe Laser
 Centreman - Charles Poulin, Saint-Hyacinthe Laser
 Right winger - Martin Gendron, Saint-Hyacinthe Laser
 Coach - Alain Sanscartier, Shawinigan Cataractes

Second team
 Goaltender - Martin Brodeur, Saint-Hyacinthe Laser
 Left defence - Benoit Larose, Laval Titan
 Right defence - Philippe Boucher, Laval Titan
 Left winger - Yves Sarault, Trois-Rivières Draveurs
 Centreman - Alexandre Daigle, Victoriaville Tigres 
 Right winger - Robert Guillet, Verdun Collège Français 
 Coach - Alain Vigneault, Hull Olympiques

Rookie team
 Goaltender - Jocelyn Thibault, Trois-Rivières Draveurs
 Left defence - Simon Roy, Shawinigan Cataractes 
 Right defence - Michael Gaul, Laval Titan 
 Left winger - Ian McIntyre, Beauport Harfangs
 Centreman - Sebastien Bordeleau, Hull Olympiques 
 Right winger - Samuel Groleau, Saint-Jean Lynx
 Coach - Bob Hartley, Laval Titan
 List of First/Second/Rookie team all-stars.

Trophies and awards
Team
President's Cup - Playoff Champions, Verdun Collège Français
Jean Rougeau Trophy - Regular Season Champions, Verdun Collège Français
Robert Lebel Trophy - Team with best GAA, Trois-Rivières Draveurs

Player
Michel Brière Memorial Trophy - Most Valuable Player, Charles Poulin, Saint-Hyacinthe Laser
Jean Béliveau Trophy - Top Scorer, Patrick Poulin, Saint-Hyacinthe Lasers
Guy Lafleur Trophy - Playoff MVP, Robert Guillet, Verdun Collège Français
Shell Cup – Offensive - Offensive Player of the Year, Martin Gendron, Saint-Hyacinthe Laser
Shell Cup – Defensive - Defensive Player of the Year, Jean-Francois Labbe, Trois-Rivières Draveurs 
Transamerica Plaque - Best plus/minus total, Carl Boudreau, Trois-Rivières Draveurs 
Jacques Plante Memorial Trophy - Best GAA, Jean-Francois Labbe, Trois-Rivières Draveurs
Emile Bouchard Trophy - Defenceman of the Year, Francois Groleau, Shawinigan Cataractes 
Mike Bossy Trophy - Best Pro Prospect, Paul Brousseau, Hull Olympiques
Molson Cup - Rookie of the Year, Alexandre Daigle, Victoriaville Tigres 
Michel Bergeron Trophy - Offensive Rookie of the Year, Alexandre Daigle, Victoriaville Tigres
Raymond Lagacé Trophy - Defensive Rookie of the Year, Philippe DeRouville, Verdun Collège Français
Frank J. Selke Memorial Trophy - Most sportsmanlike player, Martin Gendron, Saint-Hyacinthe Laser
Marcel Robert Trophy - Best Scholastic Player, Simon Toupin, Beauport Harfangs
Paul Dumont Trophy - Personality of the Year, Patrick Poulin, Saint-Hyacinthe Laser

Executive
John Horman Trophy - Executive of the Year, Claude Lemieux, Saint-Hyacinthe Laser
St-Clair Group Plaque - Marketing Director of the Year, Michel Boisvert, Shawinigan Cataractes

See also
1992 Memorial Cup
1992 NHL Entry Draft
1991–92 OHL season
1991–92 WHL season

References
 Official QMJHL Website
 www.hockeydb.com/

Quebec Major Junior Hockey League seasons
QMJHL